Robert Arshavirovich Sahakyants (30 August 1950 – 24 September 2009) was an Armenian animator in the former Soviet Union and Armenia.

Life

Sahakyants was born in Baku, in Soviet Azerbaijan, on 30 August 1950. In 1964, he and his family moved to Yerevan, Soviet Armenia.

Since 1970, he has worked at the Armenfilm film studio as an animator, and since 1972 as an animated director. He was the author of many cartoons and in 1987, was awarded the title of Honored Art Worker of the Armenian SSR. In the same year, his animated film, The Lesson, was shown at the Soviet Union film festival where it won an award. In 2008, he received the title of Honored Artist of Armenia.

He died on 24 September 2009 in Yerevan, Armenia.

Selected filmography
 Kikos (1979)
 The Lesson (1987)

See also
 List of Armenian films

References

External links
 
 Profile at Animator.ru

Soviet animators
Film people from Baku
1950 births
2009 deaths
Armenian animators
Armenian animated film directors
20th-century Armenian artists